The Illinois State League (ISL) was a baseball minor league formed in 1947. The Illinois State League operated in 1947–1948 and evolved to become today's Midwest League. The Class D league was composed entirely of new franchises, each located in Southern Illinois. The charter franchises were in the Illinois cities of Belleville, Centralia, Marion, Mattoon, Mount Vernon and West Frankfort.

History
The Illinois State League formed in 1947. The first league president was Howard V. Millard. The Illinois State League had the same six franchises in both of its seasons: the Belleville Stags, Centralia Cubs, Marion Indians, Mattoon Indians, Mount Vernon Braves, and West Frankfort Cardinals.
 
In 1947, the league began play, with a 120–game season played in two halves. There was no championship series in 1947 as the Belleville Stags won both halves and were declared as the champion. 

In 1948, the West Frankfort Cardinals finished 85–35 in the regular season, for the best record overall. In the playoffs, West Frankfort swept the Mattoon Indians in three games in the Championship Series to capture the 1948 championship.

The Illinois State League was renamed the Mississippi–Ohio Valley League after the 1948 season. The name change occurred as the Marion Indians moved to the state of Kentucky to become the Paducah Chiefs. Subsequently, the Mississippi–Ohio Valley League operated through 1955. In 1956, the league changed names again to become the Midwest League. The Midwest League has remained in operation since 1956.

All–Star games
The Illinois State League held an annual All–Star Game, which featured an all–star team versus the team with the best record in the standings. The first All–Star Game was held on August 12, 1947 at Memorial Stadium in West Frankfort. The Illinois State League All–Stars defeated Belleville 5–1. 

The 1948 Illinois State League All–Star Game was July 12, 1948 at Mattoon Baseball Park. The 1948 All–Stars defeated the Mattoon Indians 1–0.

Illinois State League teams: 1947–1948

Standings & statistics

1947 season

No 1947 Playoffs were played. Belleville won both halves.

1948 season 
 
Playoffs: West Frankfort 3 games, Marion 1; Mattoon 3 games, Mt. Vernon 2; Finals: West Frankfort 3 games, Mattoon 0.

References

Illinois State League
Defunct minor baseball leagues in the United States
Baseball leagues in Illinois
Defunct professional sports leagues in the United States
Mississippi-Ohio Valley League
Midwest League
Sports leagues established in 1947
Sports leagues disestablished in 1948